Draško Vilfan (4 February 1914 – 7 May 1996) was a Slovenian swimmer. He competed in three events at the 1936 Summer Olympics.

References

External links
 

1914 births
1996 deaths
Slovenian male swimmers
Yugoslav male swimmers
Olympic swimmers of Yugoslavia
Swimmers at the 1936 Summer Olympics
Sportspeople from Trieste